The Taipei Metro Songshan Airport station is located in Songshan, Taipei, Taiwan. It is a station on Wenhu line and serves as a transportation gateway to Taipei Songshan Airport.

Station overview

This four-level, underground station features an island platform and three exits. The station is 150 meters long, 20 meters wide, and is accessible from Songshan Airport via a 42-meter long underground cross passage.
This station is the one of the only two underground stations on the Wenhu line, the other being  station. They are also the first underground stations in the system to have platform doors.

In addition to developing food facilities in the underground passage connecting the station to the airport, an "airport library" will also be opened.

From 30 March 1936 until 1976, there was also a Songshan Airport station located on the now-defunct TRA  which was linked to Songshan Station by an intermediate station (Songshan Power Plant Station), but the TRA station was built at a different location from the present Metro station.

History
15 April 2003: Construction of the station begins.
December 2005: Work on the underground cross passage to Taipei Songshan Airport begins.
28 July 2008: Construction of the station is completed.
4 July 2009: Begins operations with the opening of Brown Line.

Station layout

Station exits
All exits are accessible by escalator, elevator, and stairs.

Exit 1: East side of Taipei Songshan Airport 
Exit 2: West side of Taipei Songshan Airport 
Exit 3: 40 meters in front of Taipei Songshan Airport

Public art

Because of the station's proximity to Songshan Airport, many of the public art works in the station revolve around flight and travel. The overall theme for the station is "The Story of Flight". The artworks were selected as part of a contest, with the open selection process beginning in July 2006 and winners announced in December 2006.

Grand Tour
Materials: Glass (clear), matte steel (white)
Location: Exit 3 Square
Description: In this age, travel is no longer a dream but something you can do at any time. This piece features a large glass and metal suitcase.

Flying Projects
Materials: Black steel, LED lights, glass, matte stainless steel
Location: Ticketing area wall, concourse level
Description: To mankind, flight brings about freedom. This piece represents mankind's enthusiasm for flight.

Dreams of Flying
Materials: Stainless steel, aluminum, canvas flame retardants, steel gears
Location: Ceiling, platform level
Description: In order to realize dreams of flying, mankind created different machines to achieve it. These pieces all represent man-powered machines and were made from everyday objects.

Around the station
 Taipei Songshan Airport
 Civil Aeronautics Administration, MOTC
 Institute of Transportation
Aviation Police Office, Taipei Branch
Minzu Elementary School
Dunhua Park

References

2009 establishments in Taiwan
Airport railway stations in Taiwan
Railway stations opened in 2009
Wenhu line stations